Events from the year 1545 in art.

Events

Works

Paintings
Bronzino
Eleanor of Toledo with her son Giovanni de' Medici
Portrait of Cosimo I de' Medici
Portrait of Giovanni de' Medici as a Child
Venus, Cupid, Folly and Time
Lucas Cranach the Younger – The Conversion of St. Paul
Gerlach Flicke – Thomas Cranmer
 Master John – Catherine Parr (approximate date)
Michelangelo – The Conversion of Saul
Francesco de' Rossi (Il Salviati) – Triumph of Camillus (fresco for Cosimo I de' Medici in Sala dell'Udienza, Palazzo Vecchio, Florence (completed))
Titian – some dates approximate
Portrait of a Young Englishman
Portrait of Lavinia Vecellio
Portrait of Pietro Aretino
Portrait of Pope Paul III
Daniele da Volterra (after drawings by Michelangelo) – Descent from the Cross (approximate date)

Sculpture
 (approx. date) – Hans Gieng of Fribourg completes work on the fountains of Bern in Switzerland.

Births
date unknown
Farrukh Beg, Mughal painter who served in the court of Muhammad Hakim (died 1615)
Francesco da Urbino, Italian painter (died 1582)
Hans Collaert, Flemish engraver and draughtsman (died 1628)
Frans Pourbus the Elder, Flemish Renaissance painter primarily of religious and portraits (died 1581)
William Rogers, English engraver (died 1604)
Marco Vecellio, Italian painter, nephew of Titian (died 1611)
Juan Zariñena, Spanish painter (died 1634)

Deaths
September - Hans Baldung, German Renaissance artist as painter and printmaker in woodcut (born 1484)
date unknown
Alejo Fernandez, Spanish painter best known for his portrait of Christopher Columbus (born 1475)
Rueland Frueauf the Younger - German Late-Gothic painter (born 1470)
Albrecht Glockendon the Younger, German miniaturist and woodcutter (born 1500)
Vicente Juan Masip - Spanish painter of the Renaissance period (born 1475)
Wang E, Chinese landscape painter (born 1465)

 
Years of the 16th century in art